Actinomyces radicidentis is a species in the genus Actinomyces, first isolated from infected root canals of teeth. Once characterized, it has since been found to be present in failed root canal treatments. Its pathogenicity has been suggested to be due to an ability to form cell aggregates, held together by embedding in an extracellular matrix in host tissues. Like other pathogenic Actinomyces, by collectively finding itself in a protected biofilm environment can evade elimination by host defenses, including phagocytosis.

References

Further reading
 Whitman, William B., et al., eds. Bergey's manual® of systematic bacteriology. Vol. 5. Springer, 2012.

External links
 
 LPSN
 Type strain of Actinomyces radicidentis at BacDive -  the Bacterial Diversity Metadatabase

Actinomycetales
Gram-positive bacteria
Bacteria described in 2001